Centrifugal pumps are used to transport fluids by the conversion of rotational kinetic energy to the hydrodynamic energy of the fluid flow. The rotational energy typically comes from an engine or electric motor. They are a sub-class of dynamic axisymmetric work-absorbing turbomachinery. The fluid enters the pump impeller along or near to the rotating axis and is accelerated by the impeller, flowing radially outward into a diffuser or volute chamber (casing), from which it exits.

Common uses include water, sewage, agriculture, petroleum, and petrochemical pumping. Centrifugal pumps are often chosen for their high flow rate capabilities, abrasive solution compatibility, mixing potential, as well as their relatively simple engineering. A centrifugal fan is commonly used to implement an air handling unit or vacuum cleaner. The reverse function of the centrifugal pump is a water turbine converting potential energy of water pressure into mechanical rotational energy.

History

According to Reti, the first machine that could be characterized as a centrifugal pump was a mud lifting machine which appeared as early as 1475 in a treatise by the Italian Renaissance engineer Francesco di Giorgio Martini. True centrifugal pumps were not developed until the late 17th century, when Denis Papin built one using straight vanes. The curved vane was introduced by British inventor John Appold in 1851.

How it works

Like most pumps, a centrifugal pump converts rotational energy, often from a motor, to energy in a moving fluid. A portion of the energy goes into kinetic energy of the fluid. Fluid enters axially through eye of the casing, is caught up in the impeller blades, and is whirled tangentially and radially outward until it leaves through all circumferential parts of the impeller into the diffuser part of the casing. The fluid gains both velocity and pressure while passing through the impeller. The doughnut-shaped diffuser, or scroll, section of the casing decelerates the flow and further increases the pressure.

Description by Euler
A consequence of Newton's second law of mechanics is the conservation of the angular momentum (or the “moment of momentum”) which is of fundamental significance to all turbomachines. Accordingly, the change of the angular momentum is equal to the sum of the external moments. Angular momentums ρ×Q×r×cu at inlet and outlet, an external torque M and friction moments due to shear stresses Mτ are acting on an impeller or a diffuser.

Since no pressure forces are created on cylindrical surfaces in the circumferential direction, it is possible to write Eq. (1.10) as:

   (1.13)

Euler's pump equation

Based on Eq.(1.13) Euler developed the head pressure equation created by the impeller see Fig.2.2

     (1)

        (2)

In Eq. (2) the sum of 4 front element number call static pressure, the sum of last 2 element number call velocity pressure look carefully on the Fig 2.2 and the detail equation.

Ht theory head pressure  ;    g = between 9.78 and 9.82 m/s2 depending on latitude, conventional standard value of exactly 9.80665 m/s2    barycentric gravitational acceleration

u2=r2.ω  the peripheral circumferential velocity vector
  
u1=r1.ω  the inlet circumferential velocity vector

ω=2π.n angular velocity

w1    inlet relative velocity vector

w2    outlet relative velocity vector

c1    inlet absolute velocity vector

c2    outlet absolute velocity vector

Velocity Triangle

The color triangle formed by velocity vector u,c,w called "velocity triangle". This rule was helpful to detail Eq.(1) become Eq.(2) and wide explained how the pump works.

Fig 2.3 (a) shows triangle velocity of forward curved vanes impeller ; Fig 2.3 (b) shows triangle velocity of radial straight vanes impeller. It illustrates rather clearly energy added to the flow (shown in vector c) inversely change upon flow rate Q (shown in vector cm).

Efficiency factor

,

where:
 is the mechanics input power required (W)
 is the fluid density (kg/m3)
 is the standard acceleration of gravity (9.80665 m/s2)
 is the energy Head added to the flow (m)
 is the flow rate (m3/s)
 is the efficiency of the pump plant as a decimal
The head added by the pump is a sum of the static lift, the head loss due to friction and any losses due to valves or pipe bends all expressed in metres of fluid. Power is more commonly expressed as kilowatts (103 W, kW) or horsepower. The value for the pump efficiency, may be stated for the pump itself or as a combined efficiency of the pump and motor system.

Vertical centrifugal pumps

Vertical centrifugal pumps are also referred to as cantilever pumps. They utilize a unique shaft and bearing support configuration that allows the volute to hang in the sump while the bearings are outside the sump.  This style of pump uses no stuffing box to seal the shaft but instead utilizes a "throttle bushing".  A common application for this style of pump is in a parts washer.

Froth pumps

In the mineral industry, or in the extraction of oilsand, froth is generated to separate the rich minerals or bitumen from the sand and clays. Froth contains air that tends to block conventional pumps and cause loss of prime. Over history, industry has developed different ways to deal with this problem. In the pulp and paper industry holes are drilled in the impeller. Air escapes to the back of the impeller and a special expeller discharges the air back to the suction tank. The impeller may also feature special small vanes between the primary vanes called split vanes or secondary vanes. Some pumps may feature a large eye, an inducer or recirculation of pressurized froth from the pump discharge back to the suction to break the bubbles.

Multistage centrifugal pumps

A centrifugal pump containing two or more impellers is called a multistage centrifugal pump. The impellers may be mounted on the same shaft or on different shafts. At each stage, the fluid is directed to the center before making its way to the discharge on the outer diameter.

For higher pressures at the outlet, impellers can be connected in series. For higher flow output, impellers can be connected in parallel.

A common application of the multistage centrifugal pump is the boiler feedwater pump. For example, a 350 MW unit would require two feedpumps in parallel. Each feedpump is a multistage centrifugal pump producing 150 L/s at 21 MPa.

All energy transferred to the fluid is derived from the mechanical energy driving the impeller. This can be measured at isentropic compression, resulting in a slight temperature increase (in addition to the pressure increase).

Energy usage
The energy usage in a pumping installation is determined by the flow required, the height lifted and the length and friction characteristics of the pipeline.
The power required to drive a pump, is defined simply using SI units by:

where:
 is the input power required (W)
 is the fluid density (kg/m3)
 is the standard acceleration of gravity (9.80665 m/s2)
 is the energy Head added to the flow (m)
 is the flow rate (m3/s)
 is the efficiency of the pump plant as a decimal
The head added by the pump is a sum of the static lift, the head loss due to friction and any losses due to valves or pipe bends all expressed in metres of fluid. Power is more commonly expressed as kilowatts (103 W, kW) or horsepower (hp = kW/0.746). The value for the pump efficiency, may be stated for the pump itself or as a combined efficiency of the pump and motor system.

The energy usage is determined by multiplying the power requirement by the length of time the pump is operating.

Problems of centrifugal pumps
These are some difficulties faced in centrifugal pumps:
 Cavitation—the net positive suction head (NPSH) of the system is too low for the selected pump
 Wear of the impeller—can be worsened by suspended solids or cavitation
 Corrosion inside the pump caused by the fluid properties
 Overheating due to low flow
 Leakage along rotating shaft.
 Lack of prime—centrifugal pumps must be filled (with the fluid to be pumped) in order to operate
 Surge 
 Viscous liquids may reduce efficiency
 Other pump types may be more suitable for high pressure applications
 Large solids or debris may clog the pump

Centrifugal pumps for solids control
An oilfield solids control system needs many centrifugal pumps to sit on or in mud tanks. The types of centrifugal pumps used are sand pumps, submersible slurry pumps, shear pumps, and charging pumps. They are defined for their different functions, but their working principle is the same.

Magnetically coupled pumps

Magnetically coupled pumps, or magnetic drive pumps, vary from the traditional pumping style, as the motor is coupled to the pump by magnetic means rather than by a direct mechanical shaft. The pump works via a drive magnet, 'driving' the pump rotor, which is magnetically coupled to the primary shaft driven by the motor. They are often used where leakage of the fluid pumped poses a great risk (e.g., aggressive fluid in the chemical or nuclear industry, or electric shock - garden fountains). They have no direct connection between the motor shaft and the impeller, so no stuffing box or gland is needed. There is no risk of leakage, unless the casing is broken. Since the pump shaft is not supported by bearings outside the pump's housing, support inside the pump is provided by bushings. The pump size of a magnetic drive pumps can go from few watts of power to a giant 1 MW.

Priming
The process of filling the pump with liquid is called priming. All centrifugal pumps require liquid in the liquid casing to prime. If the pump casing becomes filled with vapors or gases, the pump impeller becomes gas-bound and incapable of pumping.  To ensure that a centrifugal pump remains primed and does not become gas-bound, most centrifugal pumps are located below the level of the source from which the pump is to take its suction. The same effect can be gained by supplying liquid to the pump suction under pressure supplied by another pump placed in the suction line.

Self-priming centrifugal pump
In normal conditions, common centrifugal pumps are unable to evacuate the air from an inlet line leading to a fluid level whose geodetic altitude is below that of the pump. Self-priming pumps have to be capable of evacuating air (see Venting) from the pump suction line without any external auxiliary devices.

Centrifugal pumps with an internal suction stage such as water-jet pumps or side-channel pumps are also classified as self-priming pumps. Self-Priming centrifugal pumps were invented in 1935. One of the first companies to market a self-priming centrifugal pump was American Marsh in 1938.

Centrifugal pumps that are not designed with an internal or external self-priming stage can only start to pump the fluid after the pump has initially been primed with the fluid. Sturdier but slower, their impellers are designed to move liquid, which is far denser than air, leaving them unable to operate when air is present. In addition, a suction-side swing check valve or a vent valve must be fitted to prevent any siphon action and ensure that the fluid remains in the casing when the pump has been stopped. In self-priming centrifugal pumps with a separation chamber the fluid pumped and the entrained air bubbles are pumped into the separation chamber by the impeller action.

The air escapes through the pump discharge nozzle whilst the fluid drops back down and is once more entrained by the impeller. The suction line is thus continuously evacuated. The design required for such a self-priming feature has an adverse effect on pump efficiency. Also, the dimensions of the separating chamber are relatively large. For these reasons this solution is only adopted for small pumps, e.g. garden pumps. More frequently used types of self-priming pumps are side-channel and water-ring pumps. 

Another type of self-priming pump is a centrifugal pump with two casing chambers and an open impeller. This design is not only used for its self-priming capabilities but also for its degassing effects when pumping two-phase mixtures (air/gas and liquid) for a short time in process engineering or when handling polluted fluids, for example, when draining water from construction pits. This pump type operates without a foot valve and without an evacuation device on the suction side. The pump has to be primed with the fluid to be handled prior to commissioning. Two-phase mixture is pumped until the suction line has been evacuated and the fluid level has been pushed into the front suction intake chamber by atmospheric pressure. During normal pumping operation this pump works like an ordinary centrifugal pump.

See also
 Centrifugal compressor
 Axial flow pump
 Net positive suction head (NPSH)
 Pump
 Seal (mechanical)
 Specific speed (Ns or Nss)
 Thermodynamic pump testing
 Turbine
 Turbopump

References

Sources
 ASME B73 Standards Committee, Chemical Standard Pumps

External links

Pumps
Gas compressors
Turbines
Hydraulic engineering
Power engineering
Articles containing video clips